Koenig Valley is an ice-free valley just east of Mount Thor in the Asgard Range of Victoria Land, Antarctica. It was named by the Advisory Committee on Antarctic Names for Ervon R. Koenig, who Managed Contractor support operations staff and the biological and earth sciences Research laboratories at McMurdo Station and provided oversight management of construction of the new South Pole Station in the 71-72 season. Scientific  leader at McMurdo Station with the 1972 winter party and shared a joint command relationship with the US Navy base commander. Continued as station manager there in the 73-74 season. Relieved the USNavy winter over team at Palmer Station, Antarctic Peninsula in 1973 and established civilian operations. Staffed and managed the base operations team at Palmer Station during the austral summer. Developed base operations plan and oriented new contractor team for 1974-75 season winter over operations and research support.

References

Valleys of Victoria Land
McMurdo Dry Valleys